"Don't You Worry" (stylized in all caps) is a song by American group Black Eyed Peas, Colombian singer and songwriter Shakira and French DJ David Guetta. It was released on June 17, 2022, through BEP Music and Epic Records and later included on the Black Eyed Peas' ninth studio album Elevation as the fourteenth track and lead single. The song failed to enter the US Hot 100, but peaked at number 22 on the Bubbling Under Hot 100 and at number 69 on the UK Singles Chart.

Reception 
The doing was poorly reviewed, with Rolling Stone India listing "Don't You Worry" as one of the 10 Worst International Songs of 2022, stating that it "...is so derivative of 'I Gotta Feeling' that you wonder, do they really think people won't realize it's basically the same song? With lyrics that literally a third-grader could write, the song is elementary school basic and it's really a shame that there is a listening audience that still eats this up."

Credits and personnel 
Adapted from Tidal.

Black Eyed Peas – lead artist
Angelo Carretta – vocal engineer
David Clauss – vocal engineer
Mikkel Cox - producer
Dylan "3D" Dresdow – engineer, mastering engineer, mixing engineer
Tobias Frederiksen – producer
Johnny Goldstein – producer
David Guetta – co-lead artist, producer
Cameron Gower Poole – vocal engineer
Roger Rodés – vocal engineer
Shakira – co-lead artist
will.i.am – producer

Charts

Weekly charts

Monthly charts

Year-end charts

Certifications

Awards and nominations

References

2022 songs
2022 singles
Black Eyed Peas songs
Shakira songs
David Guetta songs
Songs written by will.i.am
Songs written by Shakira
Songs written by David Guetta
Song recordings produced by will.i.am
Song recordings produced by David Guetta
Music videos directed by Director X